Lena Sulkanen (born 18 September 1960) is a former Swedish female bowler. She competed at the 1983 Tenpin World Bowling Championship. Sulkanen won the women's singles in the 1983 Tenpin Bowling World Championship and also won the Masters title in the only Tenpin Bowling World Championship in which she was eligible to participate.

References 

1960 births
Living people
Swedish ten-pin bowling players
Sportspeople from Stockholm